Jaime Augusto Miranda Zóbel de Ayala II  (born March 6, 1959), also known as Jaime Augusto Zóbel, is a Filipino businessman from the prominent Zóbel de Ayala family. He currently serves as the chairman of Ayala Corporation. He succeeded his father, Jaime Zóbel de Ayala, as the company's president and CEO in 1994. He was the company's chairman and CEO from 2007 to 2020.

In addition to his position in the Ayala Corporation, Zobel is chairman of Globe Telecom, Bank of the Philippine Islands, and Integrated Microelectronics Inc. (IMI); vice chairman of the board of directors and member of the Executive Committee of Ayala Land, Inc. (ALI); and co-chairman and trustee of Ayala Foundation, Inc.

Personal life and education 
Zobel studied at the Ateneo de Manila University (1966–1968), Ladycross School (1968–1971), and Worth School (1972–1976) before earning a B.A. degree in economics (cum laude) from Harvard College in 1981, and an MBA from Harvard Business School in 1987. He is married to Elizabeth (Lizzie) Eder, a descendant of James Martin Eder. The couple have four children and two grandchildren.

Career 
He sits on the boards of various international and local business and socio-civic organizations:

 Chairman, Bank of the Philippine Islands
 Chairman, Globe Telecom, Inc.
 Chairman, AC Industrial Technology Holdings, Inc.
 Co-Chairman, Ayala Foundation, Inc.
 Vice Chairman, AC Energy Holdings Inc.
 Chairman Emeritus, Asia Business Council
 Member, Asean Business Club
 Chairman Emeritus, Eisenhower Fellowships
 Member, Harvard Business School Board of Dean’s Advisors
 Chair, Harvard Business School Asia-Pacific Advisory Board
 Member, Harvard Business School Asia Advisory Committee
 Member, Harvard Global Advisory Council
 Member, Harvard University Asia Center Advisory Committee
 Member, JP Morgan International Council
 Member, JP Morgan Asia Pacific Council
 Member, Mitsubishi Corporation International Advisory Committee
 Trustee, Singapore Management University (SMU)
 Chairman, SMU International Advisory Council in the Philippines
 Member, Asia Global Institute (University of Hong Kong) Advisory Board
 Member, Temasek Holdings Board
 Member, Advisory Committee to National Economic Development Authority (NEDA) on Filipino 2040
 Trustee, Ramon Magsaysay Awards Foundation
 Member, Council for Inclusive Capitalism with the Vatican
 Co-Vice-Chairman, Makati Business Club
 Board Member, Endeavor Philippines

In the past, he held the following positions:

 Vice Chairman, Manila Water Co. Inc.
 Member, The Asia Society, International Council
 Trustee, Eisenhower Fellowships
 Member, Leapfrog Investment, Board of Advisor, Global Leadership Council
 Steward, The Council for Inclusive Capitalism
 Chairman, Children’s Hour Philippines, Inc.
 Trustee, Children’s Hour Philippines, Inc.
 Chairman, Endeavor Philippines
 Member, Philippine Chamber of Commerce and Industry (PCCI) - Council of Senior Business Advisers (CSA)
 Trustee, The Hunger Project
 Member, Harvard Business School Visiting Committee
 Member, World Wildlife Fund (US), Board of Directors
 Member, World Wildlife Fund (US), National Council
 Chairman, World Wildlife Fund, Philippines
 Member, New York Stock Exchange Asia Pacific Advisory Committee
 Chairman, Ramon Magsaysay Awards Foundation
 Philippine Representative, APEC Business Advisory Council
 Member, University of Tokyo, President’s Council

Honors and awards 
Honors include World Economic Forum Global Leader for Tomorrow in 1995; Emerging Markets CEO of the year in 1998 (sponsored by ING); Philippine TOYM (Ten Outstanding Young Men) Award in 1999 and Management Association of the Philippines Management Man of the Year Award in 2006.

On September 27, 2007,  he was conferred Harvard Business School’s highest honor, the Alumni Achievement Award, by Dean Jay O. Light. Zobel de Ayala was cited for “his innovative, entrepreneurial style of management (that) has benefited both Ayala and an island nation that faces significant social and economic challenges.” He is the first Filipino to receive this award.

Zóbel was then conferred the Presidential Medal of Merit in 2009 and the Philippine Legion of Honor, Rank of Grand Commander in 2010.

Later on, Finance Asia named him Best CEO for 2009/2010 and he received the CNBC Asia Business Leader Award in 2010.

On November 25, 2010, Zobel received the Asia Talent Management Award at the 9th CNBC Asia Business Leaders Awards held in Singapore. Zobel was recognized for “his personal involvement in supporting and nurturing leadership within the company.” Zobel was quoted as saying that he and his brother Fernando Zobel de Ayala, president and COO of Ayala, consider succession planning as a critical element in ensuring the corporation’s sustainability. He was the third Filipino to be recognized by the annual program, following Globe Telecom CEO Gerardo Ablaza, Jr. who received the ABLA in 2004, and Jollibee CEO Tony Tan Caktiong for corporate citizenship in 2006.”

On September 14, 2017, Zobel was named by the United Nations Global Compact as one of the 10 Sustainable Development Goals (SDG) Pioneers for the year 2017. He was the first Filipino and Southeast Asian to be recognized with this honor.  Since 2016, the UN Global Compact has identified individuals "who were showcasing how business can be a force for good" and recognized them "for their efforts and achievements in advancing the SDGs."

See also
 Zobel de Ayala family

References

External links
 Ayala Malls
  Ayala at 175 Magazine
  Ayala 2009 Annual Report

1959 births
Filipino bankers
Filipino chief executives
Filipino people of German descent
Filipino people of Spanish descent
Filipino people of Basque descent
Living people
Jaime
People educated at Worth School
People from Manila
Harvard Business School alumni
Asian Institute of Management people
Recipients of the Presidential Medal of Merit (Philippines)
Harvard College alumni